"Point of View" is a song by Italian electronic music group DB Boulevard, written by Alfredo Comazzetto and vocalist Moony under her real name, Monica Bragato. The song is based around a sample of "Heatwave" by French band Phoenix, so Deck D'Arcy, Laurent Brancowitz, Thomas Mars Jr., and Christian Mazzalai are also credited as writers. "Point of View" became a chart hit in Europe and Australia and topped the US Billboard Dance Club Songs chart. The music video of the song features a computer-animated cardboard woman.

Track listings

Italian CD single
 "Point of View" (T&F Crushed Broggio radio edit) – 3:42
 "Point of View" (Pianopella) – 4:00
 "Point of View" (Broggio club mix) – 5:46

Italian 12-inch single
A1. "Point of View" (Molella vs. Gabry Ponte remix) – 6:17
B1. "Point of Dub" (Lange remix) – 6:27
B2. "Point of View" (Broggio club mix) – 5:40

European CD single
 "Point of View" (radio edit) – 3:40
 "Point of Dub" (Lange remix) – 8:10

UK CD single
 "Point of View" (radio edit) – 3:50
 "Point of View" (original club mix) – 5:35
 "Point of Dub" (Lange remix) – 6:27
 "Point of View" (video)

UK 12-inch single
A1. "Point of View" (original club mix) – 5:35
A2. "Point of Dub" (Lange remix) – 6:27
AA. "Point of Dub" (Quivver's vocal mix) – 7:44

UK cassette single
 "Point of View" (radio edit) – 3:50
 "Point of View" (original club mix) – 5:35
 "Point of Dub" (Audio Drive's Easy Life remix) – 7:40

Australian CD single
 "Point of View" (radio edit) – 3:50
 "Point of View" (original club mix) – 5:35
 "Point of Dub" (Lange remix) – 6:27

Credits and personnel
Credits are lifted from the UK CD single liner notes.

Studios
 Recorded at Recycle Studio (Sacile, Italy)
 Mixed at Moltosugo Studios (Padova, Italy)

Personnel

 Alfredo Comazzetto – writing
 Moony – writing (as Monica Bragato), vocals
 Deck D'Arcy – writing ("Heatwave", titled "Acapulco Mix" on liner notes)
 Laurent Brancowitz – writing ("Heatwave")
 Thomas Mars Jr. – writing ("Heatwave")
 Christian Mazzalai – writing ("Heatwave")
 DB Boulevard – production, arrangement
 Roy Malone – mixing
 Frankie Tamburo – executive production
 Mauro Ferrucci – executive production

Charts

Weekly charts

Year-end charts

Certifications

Release history

References

2002 songs
2002 debut singles
Animated music videos
Epic Records singles